San Tong Po is a village in Fanling, North District, Hong Kong.

Administration
San Tong Po is a recognized village under the New Territories Small House Policy.

History
At the time of the 1911 census, the population of San Tong Po was 47. The number of males was 15.

References

External links
 Delineation of area of existing village San Tong Po (Fanling) for election of resident representative (2019 to 2022)

Villages in North District, Hong Kong
Fanling